Union of Left Forces (SLS) was a Ukrainian political party led by from its founding to 2019 by Vasyl Volha. The party was banned by court order on 17 June 2022. The party was never represented in Ukraine's national parliament.

History
At the 2007 Ukrainian parliamentary election, the Socialist Party of Ukraine experienced a decline in support. Afterwards, Vasyl Volha left the party and created the Union of Leftists. The party was founded on 8 December 2007 and its goals were empower local communities, provide state support for poor regions, stop the privatization of strategic state enterprises and the sale of agricultural land, make Ukraine geopolitically neutral and make Russian the second state language.

In November 2008, the party headquarters were the target of arson. According to the party, this was connected to an action against radical nationalism in Ukraine conducted by the party in Simferopol the day before where they burned swastikas and flags of some nationalist parties. The party participated in the 2010 Ukrainian presidential election as part of the Bloc of Left and Center-left Forces and supported Petro Symonenko as this bloc joint candidate for the post of President of Ukraine at the 2010 Ukrainian presidential election. The party did not participate in the 2012 Ukrainian parliamentary election, as well as the 2014 Ukrainian parliamentary election.

In 2019, the party leader became . The party failed to register its party list for the 2019 Ukrainian parliamentary election.

At the 7th Party Congress on 18 December 2021, a decision was made to change the name to the political party For a New Socialism. This name change was not officially re-registered. On 18 February 2022, in the prelude to the 2022 Russian invasion of Ukraine, Goldarb appealed through the US and UK embassies to the leadership of these countries "to compensate for the damage caused to our economy due to the military panic inspired by them". On 20 March 2022, it was one of several political parties suspended by the National Security and Defense Council of Ukraine during the 2022 Russian invasion of Ukraine, along with Derzhava, Left Opposition, Nashi, Opposition Bloc, Opposition Platform — For Life, Party of Shariy, Progressive Socialist Party of Ukraine, Socialist Party of Ukraine, and the Volodymyr Saldo Bloc. On 17 June 2022, the Eighth Administrative Court of Appeal banned the party. The property of the party and all its branches were transferred to the state. On 29 September 2022 the final appeal against the party's ban was dismissed by the Supreme Court of Ukraine, meaning that the party was fully banned in Ukraine.

References

2007 establishments in Ukraine
2022 disestablishments in Ukraine
Banned political parties in Ukraine
Banned socialist parties
Defunct socialist parties in Ukraine
Democratic socialist parties in Europe
Political parties disestablished in 2022
Political parties established in 2007
Russian political parties in Ukraine
Socialist Party of Ukraine breakaway groups